Behrang (in Persian بهرنگ) is a common Iranian given name. The family name equivalent is Behrangi (in Persian بهرنگی). It is made of two components "Beh" and "Rang" that literally mean "Better" and "Color".

Behrang may refer to:

Places
Behrang, also known as Behrang Stesen, small town on Perak-Selangor border, Malaysia.
Behrang 2020, also known as Bandar Baru Behrang, township in Perak, Malaysia.
Behrang – Proton City Highway, Malaysia
Behrang railway station, Malaysia

Persons
Behrang Yousefi (born 1987), Iranian_born Canadian M.M.A Competitor 
Behrang Safari (born 1985), Iranian-born Swedish international footballer

See also
Behrangi (disambiguation)